Slit homolog 1 protein is a protein that in humans is encoded by the SLIT1 gene.

References

Further reading 

 
 
 
 
 
 
 
 
 
 

Slit proteins